Eifion was a parliamentary constituency in Caernarfonshire, Wales.  It returned one Member of Parliament (MP) to the House of Commons of the Parliament of the United Kingdom, elected by the first past the post system.

History

The constituency was created by the Redistribution of Seats Act 1885 for the 1885 general election, and abolished for the 1918 general election.

Boundaries
Eifion covered the southern part of Caernarvonshire. It included the Sessional Divisions of Eifionydd (or Portmadoc) and Pwllheli (excluding the boroughs of Caernarvon and Pwllheli and the parishes of Criccieth and Nevin) and part of the Sessional Division of Caernarvon (excluding the parishes of Llanberis and Llanddeiniolen).

Members of Parliament

Elections

Elections in the 1880s

Elections in the 1890s

Elections in the 1900s

Elections in the 1910s

General Election 1914–15:

Another General Election was required to take place before the end of 1915. The political parties had been making preparations for an election to take place and by July 1914, the following candidates had been selected; 
Liberal: Ellis William Davies
Unionist: 
Ind. Liberal: W.O. Jones

References

History of Caernarfonshire
Historic parliamentary constituencies in North Wales
Constituencies of the Parliament of the United Kingdom established in 1885
Constituencies of the Parliament of the United Kingdom disestablished in 1918
Politics of Caernarfonshire